is a Japanese anime producer, manga artist and illustrator best known as the co-founder of Tatsunoko Production. Yoshida is the younger brother of Tatsuo Yoshida and the older brother of Ippei Kuri. He replaced Tatsuo as president after the latter's death in 1977 and continued to run the company until 1987, when Kuri replaced him. On July 1, 2005, he and Kuri resigned from Tatsunoko Production when Takara merged with Tomy.

References

External links

1935 births
Living people
Japanese film producers
Manga artists
Tatsunoko Production people